Miodrag is a South Slavonic, for all purposes almost exclusively Serbian, masculine given name, derived from mio ("tender, cute") and drag ("dear, beloved"), both common in Slavonic dithematic names. It may refer to:

Miodrag Anđelković, Serbian footballer
Miodrag Belodedici, Romanian football central defender
Miodrag Božović, Montenegrin football manager and former player
Miodrag Bulatović, Montenegrin Serb novelist and playwright
Miodrag Džudović, Montenegrin footballer
Miodrag "Skale" Gvozdenović, Montenegrin volleyball player
Miodrag Ješić, Serbian footballer and football manager
Miodrag Jovanović (footballer born 1922), Serbian footballer
Miodrag Jovanović (footballer born 1977), Serbian footballer
Miodrag Koljević, Montenegrin diplomat in Russian Federation
Miodrag Kojadinović, Serbian-Canadian writer and researcher
Miodrag Krivokapić (actor), Serbian actor
Miodrag Krivokapić (footballer), Montenegrin former footballer
Miodrag Kustudic, Serbian football player of Montenegrin origin
Miodrag Pantelić, Serbian football midfielder
Miodrag Pavlović, Serbian poet
Miodrag Perišić, Serbian politician (Democratic Party in Serbia)
Miodrag Petković, professor in mathematics at the University of Niš
Miodrag Petrović (footballer), Yugoslav footballer
Miodrag Petrović Čkalja, Serbian actor and comedian
Miodrag B. Protić, Serbian painter
Miodrag Radović, Yugoslavian professional footballer
Miodrag Radulovacki, Serbian-Unitedstatesian scientist
Miodrag Simović, Judge of the Constitutional Court of Bosnia and Herzegovina
Miodrag Stošić, Serbian football player
Miodrag Stojkovic, Serbian researcher in genetics
Miodrag Todorcevic, Serbian-French chess master and coach
Miodrag Tomić, Serbian fighter pilot
Miodrag Vlahović, President of the Presidency of the Socialist Republic of Montenegro 1984 to 1985
Miodrag Vlahović (foreign minister), Montenegrin politician
Miodrag Živaljević, former Serbian striker
Miodrag Živković (politician), Montenegrin politician (Liberal Party of Montenegro)

See also
Dragomir

Slavic masculine given names
Serbian masculine given names
Montenegrin masculine given names
Croatian masculine given names
Macedonian masculine given names
Slovene masculine given names